Shahid Kolahdooz (Tehran Noo) Metro Station is the eastern end of Tehran Metro Line 4. It is located in Basij Expressway.

References 

Tehran Metro stations